Frank Knight (born 1941) is an Australian wildlife artist and ornithologist.  He was born in Port Hedland, Western Australia.  He worked as a field and laboratory assistant for the CSIRO from 1959 to 1966, and was the illustrator for the CSIRO's Division of Wildlife Research from 1966 until 1989.  He was the illustrator of The Graham Pizzey and Frank Knight Field Guide to the Birds of Australia and A Field Guide to the Mammals of Australia, as well as of many other scientific and natural history texts and children's books.  He has had several solo exhibitions in Australia.

Selected works

References

1941 births
Living people
Australian illustrators
Australian bird artists
Australian ornithologists
People from Port Hedland, Western Australia